The Piano Sonata No. 24 in F major, Op. 78, nicknamed "à Thérèse" (because it was written for Countess Thérèse von Brunswick) was written by Ludwig van Beethoven in 1809. It consists of two movements:

A typical performance takes about 8-9 minutes. The common practice of leaving out long repeated sections, such as the development and recapitulation in the first movement, would make two or three minutes' difference to the total duration. The second movement is a variation to the ending of the popular patriots song  "Rule, Britannia!".

According to Carl Czerny, Beethoven himself singled out this sonata and the "Appassionata" Sonata as favourites (once written, the "Hammerklavier" Sonata" would also become one of Beethoven's favourites).

Structure

I. Adagio cantabile – Allegro ma non troppo

II. Allegro vivace

Notes

External links
 A lecture by András Schiff on Beethoven's piano sonata Op. 78
 
 Recording by Paavali Jumppanen, piano from the Isabella Stewart Gardner Museum

Piano Sonata 24
1809 compositions
Compositions in F-sharp major
Music dedicated to nobility or royalty